The FIS Ski Jumping Continental Cup is a series of ski jumping competitions arranged yearly by the International Ski Federation. It is considered the second level of international ski jumping, ranking below the World Cup and not counting Grand Prix which world top class summer competition. Athletes competing in the Continental Cup are usually juniors and jumpers fighting for a spot on their nation's World Cup team. Some jumpers alternate between the World Cup and the Continental Cup and therefore, the winner of the Continental Cup is not necessarily the best jumper.

International Ski Federation considers the last two Europa Cup seasons in 1991/92 and 1992/93 where they competed only in Europe and with only European ski jumpers, as first two continental cup season. However, men officially began first season in 1993/94 spreading, with hosts spreading from Europe to Asian and North American ground. Competitors from United States, Canada and Asia previously competed in their own Pacific Rum Cup which was canceled, joined with Europeans on the second level of world ski jumping competition. Summer continental cup event was first time organized in 1996, however those summer events counted together in joined overall winter ranking until 2001/02. But from the season 2002/03 on, summer events counts in separated men's summer rankings.

The women competition was introduced in the 2004/05. Summer events organized already in first season like with men counted together in joined overall winter ranking until 2007/08. But from the 2008/09 on, summer events counts in separated women's summer rankings. Until the 2010/11 this was the women's top international ski jumping competition and the season later, World Cup for women was introduced in 2011/12.

So far only four individual and none of the team events in this competition have been held on ski flying hills: two events in Ironwood (1994) and two events in Vikersund (2004).

Higher competitive circuits are the World Cup and the Summer Grand Prix; the lower circuits include the FIS Cup, the FIS Race and the Alpen Cup.

Global map of all Continental Cup hosts

Men's standings

Winter

Summer

Women's standings

Winter

Summer

Wins 
First 408 individual events for men between 1991 and 2001 are not yet calculated in the incomplete winning statistics list at the International Ski Federation official homepage, where they currently run statistics only from 17 November 2001 on.
 However in this table all wins and also those from 1991 and 2001 period are included. For example: leader in this statistics Manuel Fettner has actually 21 wins and not 19 as mentioned in FIS statistics. He achieved those two wins before 17 November 2001.

Men 
As of 8 March 2020

After total of 1148 (summer+winter) events.

Women 
As of 9 February 2020

After total of 228 (summer+winter) events.

Double wins

Men

Women

References
Overall Cup Standings fis-ski.com

External links

 
Continental Cup
Recurring sporting events established in 1991
Jumping